Sergino is the name of several rural localities in Russia:
Sergino, Astrakhan Oblast, a selo in Ozernovsky Selsoviet of Ikryaninsky District of Astrakhan Oblast
Sergino, Bryansk Oblast, a village in Alexeyevsky Selsoviet of Navlinsky District of Bryansk Oblast
Sergino, Khanty-Mansi Autonomous Okrug, a settlement in Oktyabrsky District of Khanty-Mansi Autonomous Okrug
Sergino, Krasnoyarsk Krai, a settlement in Zhukovsky Selsoviet of Kozulsky District of Krasnoyarsk Krai
Sergino, Varnavinsky District, Nizhny Novgorod Oblast, a village in Bogorodsky Selsoviet of Varnavinsky District of Nizhny Novgorod Oblast
Sergino, Vetluzhsky District, Nizhny Novgorod Oblast, a village in Makaryevsky Selsoviet of Vetluzhsky District of Nizhny Novgorod Oblast
Sergino, Chanovsky District, Novosibirsk Oblast, a village in Chanovsky District, Novosibirsk Oblast
Sergino, Kuybyshevsky District, Novosibirsk Oblast, a selo in Kuybyshevsky District, Novosibirsk Oblast
Sergino, Lysva, Perm Krai, a village under the administrative jurisdiction of the town of krai significance of Lysva, Perm Krai
Sergino, Karagaysky District, Perm Krai, a village in Karagaysky District, Perm Krai
Sergino, Kishertsky District, Perm Krai, a village in Kishertsky District, Perm Krai
Sergino, Nytvensky District, Perm Krai, a selo in Nytvensky District, Perm Krai
Sergino, Kunyinsky District, Pskov Oblast, a village in Kunyinsky District, Pskov Oblast
Sergino, Novosokolnichesky District, Pskov Oblast, a village in Novosokolnichesky District, Pskov Oblast
Sergino, Ostrovsky District, Pskov Oblast, a village in Ostrovsky District, Pskov Oblast
Sergino (Kachanovskaya Rural Settlement), Palkinsky District, Pskov Oblast, a village in Palkinsky District, Pskov Oblast; municipally, a part of Kachanovskaya Rural Settlement of that district
Sergino (Vasilyevskaya Rural Settlement), Palkinsky District, Pskov Oblast, a village in Palkinsky District, Pskov Oblast; municipally, a part of Vasilyevskaya Rural Settlement of that district
Sergino (Rodovskaya Rural Settlement), Palkinsky District, Pskov Oblast, a village in Palkinsky District, Pskov Oblast; municipally, a part of Rodovskaya Rural Settlement of that district
Sergino (Rodovskaya Rural Settlement), Palkinsky District, Pskov Oblast, a village in Palkinsky District, Pskov Oblast; municipally, a part of Rodovskaya Rural Settlement of that district
Sergino, Sverdlovsk Oblast, a village in Tavdinsky District of Sverdlovsk Oblast
Sergino, Staritsky District, Tver Oblast, a village in Bernovskoye Rural Settlement of Staritsky District of Tver Oblast
Sergino, Udomelsky District, Tver Oblast, a village in Yeremkovskoye Rural Settlement of Udomelsky District of Tver Oblast
Sergino, Udmurt Republic, a selo in Serginsky Selsoviet of Balezinsky District of the Udmurt Republic